Johanna Mattsson (born 2 May 1988 in Gällivare) is a wrestler from Sweden. She is a three-time bronze medalist at the World Wrestling Championships (2010, 2017, 2021). She is also a two-time gold medalist at the European Wrestling Championships (2009 and 2014).

Career 

At the European Wrestling Championships she won gold in 2009 and 2014 and bronze in 2006 and 2017.

She won one of the bronze medals in the women's 65 kg event at the 2021 World Wrestling Championships held in Oslo, Norway.

References

 bio on fila-wrestling.com

External links
 

Living people
1988 births
Swedish female sport wrestlers
Wrestlers at the 2015 European Games
European Games competitors for Sweden
World Wrestling Championships medalists
Olympic wrestlers of Sweden
Wrestlers at the 2016 Summer Olympics
Wrestlers at the 2019 European Games
European Wrestling Championships medalists
20th-century Swedish women
21st-century Swedish women